Drug-induced thrombocytopenic purpura is a skin condition result from a low platelet count due to drug-induced anti-platelet antibodies caused by drugs such as heparin, sulfonamines, digoxin, quinine, and quinidine.

See also 
 Idiopathic thrombocytopenic purpura
 Skin lesion

References 

Vascular-related cutaneous conditions
Drug-induced diseases